Epaphra valga is a species of beetle in the family Cerambycidae, and the only species in the genus Epaphra. It was described by Newman in 1842.

References

Apomecynini
Beetles described in 1842
Monotypic Cerambycidae genera